Hans Severus Ziegler (13 October 1893 – 1 May 1978) was a German publicist, theater manager, teacher and Nazi Party official. A leading cultural director under the Nazis, he was closely associated with the censorship and cultural co-ordination of the Third Reich.

Early years
Ziegler was born on 13 October 1893 in Eisenach. He was the son of a banker and, through his mother, the grandson of Gustav Schirmer. His grandmother, the American-born Mary Francis Schirmer, was a close friend of Cosima Wagner and from an early age Ziegler was attracted to the militant nationalism in which the Wagner family were steeped. Ziegler studied German literature at university, completing his education with a PhD. He became a journalist, writing mostly for extreme right organs such as the Deutsche Wochen-Zeitung.

In 1924 Ziegler founded and edited a weekly political newspaper called Der Völkische. On 31 March 1925 Ziegler became a member of the Nazi Party, with his membership number being the comparatively low 1317. That year his newspaper expanded to a daily and changed its name to Der Nationalozialist, becoming the Nazi Party organ of Thuringia. He served as Deputy Gauleiter in Thuringia under Artur Dinter from 1925 to 1927 and under Fritz Sauckel from 1927 to 1931. In 1928 he was appointed head of the Militant League for German Culture. It was also Ziegler who in 1926 came up with the name Hitler-Jugend (Hitler Youth) for the Nazi youth movement. Ziegler was a close friend of the Schirach family and in 1925 he introduced Baldur von Schirach, who would go on to lead the Hitler Youth, to Adolf Hitler.

Ziegler was associated with the hard-line racialist wing of the Nazi Party, which looked to Alfred Rosenberg as its champion. In keeping with this wing he was particularly staunch in his anti-Semitism.

Under the Nazis

In 1933 Ziegler was appointed to the Council of State and as a member of the State Government of Thuringia. In 1935 he was placed on leave whilst he was investigated for alleged breaches of Paragraph 175, the anti-homosexual legislation, although the case was dropped. He was long assumed to be homosexual during his lifetime.

Ziegler played a leading role in promoting the Nazi vision of culture, particularly with regards to "degenerate" music. He was a strong critic of atonality, dismissing it as decadent "cultural Bolshevism". In may 1938 he curated the Entartete Musik exhibition in Düsseldorf, with Arnold Schoenberg, Alban Berg, Walter Braunfels, Karol Rathaus and Wilhelm Grosz amongst those  receiving the strongest condemnation in the pamphlet he wrote to accompany the exhibition. Whilst working under Frick, in Thuringia, Ziegler had also overseen the removal of modern art pieces from museums and public buildings, and helped to bring about a crackdown on the "glorification of Negroidism" by restricting the performance of jazz music. Promulgated in his 1930 edict Against Negro Culture, the Thuringian foreshadowed the co-ordination of culture that was to happen under the Nazi government. Entartete Musik would continue Ziegler's crusade against jazz, whilst also condemning Ernst Krenek's opera  as the archetype of Weimar decadence and miscegenation.

After the war

He also directed a private theatre from 1952 to 1954. In this role, he became a regular guest of Winifred Wagner, who regularly hosted such other far-right luminaries as Adolf von Thadden, Edda Göring, and Oswald Mosley.

Ziegler died in Bayreuth on 1 May 1978.

References

1893 births
1978 deaths
People prosecuted under anti-homosexuality laws
Antisemitism in Germany
German anti-communists
20th-century German educators
German male journalists
German male writers
German people of American descent
German theatre managers and producers
Nazi propagandists
Officials of Nazi Germany
LGBT people in the Nazi Party
People from Eisenach
Politicians from Thuringia
20th-century German journalists
20th-century German LGBT people